Tristan Lamasine and Fabrice Martin were the defending champions but chose not to defend their title.

Andre Begemann and Aliaksandr Bury won the title after defeating Johan Brunström and Andreas Siljeström 7–6(7–3), 6–7(7–9), [10–4] in the final.

Seeds

Draw

References
 Main Draw
 Qualifying Draw

Pekao Szczecin Open - Doubles